The 1990–91 National Professional Soccer League season was the seventh season for the league and first under the name National Professional Soccer League.  Teams were added in Detroit, Rockford, Illinois and Albany, New York.

League Standings

American Division

National Division

Playoffs

League Leaders

Scoring

Goalkeeping

League awards
 Most Valuable Player: Andy Chapman, Detroit
 Defender of the Year: Denzil Antonio, Canton
 Rookie of the Year: Jay Rensink, Chicago, and Bryan Finnerty, Detroit
 Goalkeeper of the Year: Jamie Swanner, Canton
 Coach of the Year: Pato Margetic, Chicago, and Brian Tinnion, Detroit

All-NPSL Teams

External links
Major Indoor Soccer League II (RSSSF)
1991 in American Soccer

1990 in American soccer leagues
1991 in American soccer leagues
1990-91